Arez may refer to:

Arez (Nisa), former parish of Nisa, Portugal
Arez (wrestler), professional wrestler

See also
Arez e Amieira do Tejo, parish of Nisa, Portugal